A coach is a large, closed, four-wheeled, passenger-carrying vehicle or carriage usually drawn by two or more horses controlled by a coachman, a postilion, or both. A coach has doors in its sides and a front and a back seat inside. The driver has a raised seat in front of the carriage to allow better vision. It is often called a box, box seat, or coach box. There are many of types of coaches depending on the vehicle's purpose.

History

In the early 14th century England, coaches would still have been extremely rare. It is unlikely there were more more than a dozen, and even then they were very costly until the end of the century. These coaches would have had four six-spoke, six-foot high wheels that were linked by greased axles under the body of the coach and they had no suspension. The chassis was made from oak beams and the barrel shaped roof was covered in brightly painted leather or cloth. The interior would include seats, beds, cushions, tapestries and even rugs. They would be pulled by four to five horses.

Kocs was the Hungarian post town in the 15th century onwards, which gave its name to a fast light vehicle, which later spread across Europe. Therefore, the English word coach, the Spanish and Portuguese coche, the German Kutsche, and the Slovak  koč and Czech kočár all probably derive from the Hungarian word "Kocsi", literally meaning "of Kocs".

One source says that in, “1564, Boonen, a Dutchman, became the Queen’s coachman, and was the first that brought the use of coaches into England.” Another source says it was not until 1580, in the reign of Queen Elizabeth I, that coaches were introduced to England from France by Henry FitzAlan, 19th Earl of Arundel.
These were designed to be pulled by a pair of horses. In 1619 George Villiers, 1st Duke of Buckingham introduced the coach drawn by six horses.

A coach with four horses is a coach-and-four. A coach together with the horses, harness and attendants is a turnout.

The bodies of early coaches were hung on leather straps. In the eighteenth century steel springs were also used in suspension systems. An advertisement in the Edinburgh Courant for 1754 reads:
The Edinburgh stage-coach, for the better accommodation of passengers, will be altered to a new genteel two-end glass coach-machine, hung on steel springs, exceedingly light and easy...
Strap suspensions persisted, however; the 19th century American Concord coaches used leather straps exactly as the first Berline from 1660 did.

A coach might have a built-in compartment called a boot, used originally as a seat for the coachman and later for storage. A luggage case for the top of a coach was called an imperial; the top, roof or second-story compartment of a coach was also known as an imperial.  The front and rear axles were connected by a main shaft called the perch or reach. A crossbar known as a splinter bar supported the springs.

In 1772, Robert Norris described the use of two coaches in Dahomey during a ceremonial procession. They were drawn by 12 men instead of horses probably as a result of the small number of horses in Dahomey.

In the 19th century the name coach was used for U.S. railway carriages, and in the 20th century to motor coaches.

See John Taylor (poet) for a very adverse opinion of the arrival of horse drawn coaches in England.

Types

There are a number of coach types, including but not limited to:
Coach: a large heavy vehicle designed to carry passengers
State Coach: A coach of state is used to carry very important persons, like a visiting head of state, royalty and (antique) high nobility such as princes and dukes on state occasions.
The principal ceremonial coaches (State Coaches) in the United Kingdom are the Gold State Coach, Irish State Coach, Lord Mayor of London's State Coach, Scottish State Coach, Speaker's State Coach. In addition there are the Australian State Coach and the Diamond Jubilee State Coach. In the Netherlands there is the Dutch Golden Coach and the Glass Coach (Dutch royal carriage).
Private coach: a very expensive cumbersome 17th century luxury replaced as they were developed by light fast carriages except on formal occasions.
Road coach: a private coach kept for pleasure. See Driving club
Drag or (U.S.) Park drag:  a gentleman's coach kept for pleasure. See Driving club

Coaches for public hire or transport

Funeral coach: not a coach but a U.S. name for a hearse, a wagon adapted to carry a coffin. Can also be used to describe a coach used by mourners following a Hearse
Hackney coach or a coach for hire. The use of these in England began in 1625. They did not stand in the streets, but at the principal inns. By 1637 there were 50 Hackney coaches for hire in London and Westminster.
Stagecoach: heavy, usually four-in-hand, closed; built to carry passengers on scheduled long-distance services changing exhausted horses at stage stations, carrying as many as twenty passengers and goods
Mail coach or post coach:  same as a stagecoach, used to transport mail but also for carrying premium-fare passengers. The first mail coach in Britain travelled from London to Edinburgh in about 1785, and to Glasgow in 1788.
Concord coach: as stagecoach —  designed with its body swung on leather thorough-braces was to help cope with bad roads.
Stage wagon or mud wagon: (U.S.) lighter and smaller than a stagecoach, flat sides, simpler joinery
Omnibus, a type of long-bodied horse-drawn coach used to transport passengers in cities and large towns. The first omnibus in London was introduced in 1829. In 1833, legislation was passed to allow these vehicles to ply the streets of that city provided the drivers and conductors took out a license and wore a badge with a number on it.
Tally-ho, a fast stage coach

Coach-building

Coach-building had reached a high degree of specialization in Britain by the middle of the 19th century. Separate branches of the trade dealt with the timber, iron, leather, brass and other materials used. And there were many minor specialists within each of these categories. The “body-makers” produced the body or vehicle itself, while the “carriage-makers” made the stronger timbers beneath and around the body. The timbers used included ash, beech, elm, oak, mahogany, pine, birch and larch. The tools and processes were similar to those used in cabinet-making, plus others specific to coach-making. Making the curved woodwork alone called for considerable skill. Making the iron axels, springs and other metal used was the work of the “coach-smith,” one of the most highly paid classes of workmen in London. Lining the interior of the coach with leather and painting, trimming, and decorating the exterior required the work of specialist tradesmen. Building carts and wagons involved similar skills, but of a coarser kind.

Miscellany

The business of a coachman,  like the pilot of an aircraft, was to expertly direct and take all responsibility for a coach or carriage and its horses, their stabling, feeding and maintenance and the associated staff. He was also called a jarvey or jarvie, especially in Ireland.

If he drove dangerously fast or recklessly he was a jehu (from Jehu, king of Israel, who was noted for his furious attacks in a chariot (2 Kings 9:20), or a Phaeton (from Greek Phaethon, son of Helios, who attempted to drive the chariot of the sun but managed to set the earth on fire).

A postilion or postillion sometimes rode as a guide on the near horse of a pair or of one of the pairs attached to a coach, especially when there was no coachman. A guard on a horse-drawn coach was called a shooter.

Traveling by coach, or pleasure driving in a coach, as in a tally-ho, was called coaching. In driving a coach, the coachman used a coachwhip, usually provided with a long lash. Experienced coachmen never used the lash on their horses. They used the whip to flick the ear of the leader to give them the office to move on, or cracked it next to their heads to request increased speed.

box coat: a heavy overcoat with or without shoulder capes used by coachmen (riding on the box seat) exposed to all kinds of weather. 
hammercloth: ornamented and often fringed was hung over the coachman's seat, especially on a ceremonial coach.
 cockhorse:  An extra horse led behind a coach to be hitched when passing over steep or difficult terrain.
 stable was a building to shelter horses usually close to the owner's house. Staff accommodation would be close often within the same building.
 coach house was a special building for sheltering a coach or coaches but coaches were more often kept within the stable building.
 coaching inn or coaching house  provided accommodation for travellers and usually provided a change of horses and offered stabling.
coach dog or carriage dog was trained to run in attendance on a coach particularly Dalmatians.

Coach horses
A coach horse or coacher bred for drawing a coach is typically heavier and of more compact build than a saddle horse and exhibits good style and action. Breeds include:
Breton: heavy, French, for draft or meat
German coach: large, rather coarse, heavy draft horse or harness horse; bay, brown or black in color
Hanoverian: developed by crossing heavy cold-blooded German horses with Thoroughbreds
Holstein: German, heavyweight, for riding and dressage, initially a carriage horse; bay, black or brown. Called also Holsteiner, Warmblut, Warmblood.
Yorkshire Coach Horse: large, strong, bay or brown; dark legs, mane and tail; belongs to an English breed derived largely from the Cleveland Bay

See also 

 Carriage
 Coupé (carriage)
 Hansom
 Hearse
 Stagecoach
 Wagon
 Omnibus

References

External links

Belgian coach museum in Bree
Coaches 1750 to 1900. History Learning Site.
The Coaches: 'Travellers in Eighteenth-Century England'. Civilization defined and explained in plain English: Library of mainly eighteenth century authors by P.Atkinson.
Coaching History. By Anne Woodley. Also Coaching Accidents,  Coaching Anecdotes and A selection of Georgian Coaches
Coachman Driven Vehicles. Carriage Museum Of America.
H3875 Horse-drawn coach, mail and passenger coach, timber / metal / leather, made by Cobb and Co. Coach and Buggy Factory, Charleville, Queensland, Australia, 1890 – Powerhouse Museum Collection. Powerhouse Museum | Science + Design | Sydney Australia.
The History of Coaching—Travelling in Old England—The First Coaches Introduced of The Mail-Coach System—Amateur Coachmen in the Olden Time—Early Coaching Parades—The Dangers of the Road—Highwaymen and Reckless Drivers. The New York Times, May 5, 1878, page 10.
Col. Delancey Kane and "The Pelham Coach". Historic Pelham.
Landscape Property|Regency|Georgian|history|lifestyle|house | Going By Coach. Jane Austen Centre Bath UK England.
Some Coaching Costumes by Marie Weldon, The New York Times, Magazine Supplement, page SM4.

15th-century introductions
Coaches (carriage)
Carriages
Animal-powered vehicles
History of road transport
Horse transportation
Hungarian inventions

ru:Повозка